Sopka may refer to:

 Šopka, a Macedonian oro from the region of Kratovo
 Katherine Sopka, American scientist
 S-2 Sopka, Soviet coastal defense system
 Sopka (mound), a type of Novgorodian kurgan
 Sopka, Arkhangelsk Oblast, village in Russia

See also